The Apostolic Nunciature to Flanders was the diplomatic mission of the Holy See to the Habsburg Netherlands (a predecessor state of modern Belgium commonly referred to as "Flanders" from its component part, the County of Flanders). The diplomatic representative entrusted with this mission was an Apostolic Nuncio with the rank of an ambassador. The office came into existence in 1593 but fell into abeyance after 1634. It was recreated in 1725 and continued to 1795, ending with the annexation of the Austrian Netherlands to France.

Nuncios

Spanish Netherlands
 Ottavio Mirto Frangipani 1596–1606 
 Decio Carafa 1606–1607
 Guido Bentivoglio 1607–1615
 Ascanio Gesualdo 1615–1617
 Lucio Morra 1617–1619
 Lucio Sanseverino 1619–1621
 Giovanni Francesco Guidi di Bagno 1621–1627
 Fabio Lagonissa 1627–1634
 Lelio Falconieri 1635–1637 (appointed but never presented)
 Richard Paul Stravius, internuncio, 1634–1642

Austrian Netherlands
 Giuseppe Spinelli 1725–1731
 Silvio Valenti Gonzaga 1731–1736
 Luca Melchiore Tempi 1736–1744
 Ignazio Michele Crivelli 1744–1754
 Tommaso Maria Ghilini 1763–1775
 Ignazio Busca 1775–1785
 Cesare Brancadoro 1792–1795

References

See also
 Apostolic Nunciature to Belgium

Flanders
Apostolic Nuncios to Flanders